Rushworth and Dreaper was a company based in Liverpool, England, that built, renovated and restored pipe organs.  It was founded in 1828 by William Rushworth and closed in 2002.  This list contains the organs associated with Rushworth and Dreaper in the county of Cheshire.

New organs

Repairs and rebuilding

References

Pipe organ
Keyboard instruments